is a Japanese animator, storyboard artist, and director. He is best known for directing the anime series Slayers, Boogiepop Phantom, and Shakugan no Shana.

Filmography

Director
Aria the Scarlet Ammo
Boogiepop Phantom
Dai-Shogun – Great Revolution
Dangerous Jii-san Ja
Demon King Daimao
Freezing
Heavy Object
How a Realist Hero Rebuilt the Kingdom
Ikki Tousen
Ikki Tousen Western Wolves
Kino's Journey Life Goes On
Miracle Giants Dome-kun
Lost Universe
New Fist of the North Star
Rave Master
Senran Kagura: Ninja Flash!
Slayers series
Shakugan no Shana series
Space Pirate Mito
Starship Operators
Taboo Tattoo
The Abashiri Family

See also
Hiroshi Watanabe

References

External links
 
 Takashi Watanabe at the Internet Movie Database

1957 births
Anime directors
Fist of the North Star
Full Metal Panic!
Ikki Tousen
Japanese animated film directors
Living people
Topcraft
People from Sapporo
Slayers